Iron Lynx Motorsport Lab is an Italian auto racing team founded by Andrea Piccini, Deborah Mayer, Claudio Schiavoni and Sergio Pianezzola. The team is based in Cesena, Emilia-Romagna. They currently operate Lamborghini Huracán GT3 Evo 2 sports cars in the IMSA SportsCar Championship and GT World Challenge Europe.

History

2019 
In 2019, Iron Lynx began the "Iron Dames" project, focused on supporting and promoting women in motorsport.

2020 
At the 2020 24 Hours of Le Mans, Iron Lynx entered two cars, including an all-female line-up in the #85 Ferrari, driven by Rahel Frey, Manuela Gostner and Michelle Gatting. In October 2020, Rino Mastronardi won the GT3 Drivers Championship for Iron Lynx in the Michelin Le Mans Cup to earn an automatic invitation to the 2021 24 Hours of Le Mans.

2021 
In 2021, Iron Lynx entered the FIA World Endurance Championship for the first time. In September 2021, it was confirmed that Iron Lynx will be collaborating with Prema Powerteam to enter an Oreca 07 in the World Endurance Championship LMP2 class for 2022. On October 24, 2021, Iron Lynx clinched the LMGTE teams championship in European Le Mans, earning them an automatic invitation to the 2022 24 Hours of Le Mans. On November 20, 2021, Michelle Gatting became the first female champion of the Ferrari Challenge. Iron Lynx also won the Michelin Le Mans Cup teams championship for the second year running to earn a second automatic invitation to the 2022 24 Hours of Le Mans.

2022 

On January 12, 2022, Iron Lynx announced that they would enter 2 cars in the GTE Am class of the World Endurance Championship for 2022. Both entries will run the Ferrari 488 GTE Evo, with Claudio Schiavoni will returning for the #65 entry while Rahel Frey will return for the #85 Iron Dames entry. On February 16, Iron Lynx announced that Giancarlo Fisichella would join the WEC squad, while also announcing additional 2022 campaigns. Iron Lynx will return to the European Le Mans Series  with an LMGTE entry piloted by Davide Rigon alongside Schiavoni and Cressoni. Iron Lynx will field four full season entries in the Ferrari Challenge, piloted by Doriane Pin, Arno Dahlmeyer, Marco Pulcini and an additional driver.

2023 
On November 6, 2022, Iron Lynx announced they became Lamborghini factory team from 2023. And they enter Lamborghini Huracán GT3 EVO 2 of IMSA Sportscar Championship and GT World Challenge for 2023.
Iron Lynx also continue to enter FIA World Endurance Championship, but the problem is Lamborghini doesn't have any active GTE car. Under permission of Lamborghini, two Porsche 911 RSR-19s are used for GTE races in collaboration with Proton Competition.

Current series Results

24 Hours of Le Mans

Italian F4 Championship

† Shared results with other team

Former series results

ADAC Formula 4 Championship

† Ineligible to score points.

Timeline

Notes

External links
Iron Lynx official website

References

Italian auto racing teams
Auto racing teams established in 2017
2017 establishments in Italy
European Le Mans Series teams
FIA World Endurance Championship teams
24 Hours of Le Mans teams
Ferrari in motorsport
WeatherTech SportsCar Championship teams